The Parkhurst Building is a historic two-story commercial building in Santa Monica, California. It was built in 1927 for Clinton Gordon Parkhurst, a realtor who served as the mayor of Venice, California in the 1920s. It was designed principally by Herbert Powell of Marsh, Smith & Powell in the Mission Revival style, with an octagonal tower, gargoyles above the second-story windows, and a cupola at the top. It has been listed on the National Register of Historic Places since November 17, 1978.

References

	
National Register of Historic Places in Los Angeles County, California
Mission Revival architecture in California
Commercial buildings completed in 1927
1927 establishments in California
Buildings and structures in Santa Monica, California